Richard Óge Martyn (c. 1602 – 1648) was a Galway lawyer and member of the Catholic Confederates of Ireland. He was of the senior line of the Martyn family, one of the Tribes of Galway. He lived at Dunguaire Castle, Kinvarra. He worked with his brother-in-law and first cousin, Patrick D'Arcy, against the Plantation of Connaught in the 1630s, and served on the Supreme Council of the Confederate Catholics in the 1640s. 

Martyn also served as Mayor of Galway, 1642–1643. He and D'Arcy were part of a network of Catholic lawyers in Galway who contrived to continue in practice in defiance of the Penal Laws, which barred Catholics from the professions. Richard was admitted to the King's Inns in 1631: he was suspended from practice at the Irish Bar in 1635 as a known Catholic, but permitted to resume practice in 1637, apparently because he had sworn the Oath of Supremacy.

Friends and acquaintances included John Lynch, Mary Bonaventure Browne, and Sir Dermott Ó Seachnasaigh. His contemporaries included Mícheál Ó Cléirigh and Randal MacDonnell, 1st Marquess of Antrim.

1641 Depositions

Martyn is mentioned in several of the 1641 Depositions concerning the events in Galway from early 1642 to summer 1643, in which he took a leading part:

 William Hamond – 
 Joseph Hampton –  (including) Richard Martin, 
 William Lincoln – 
 Thomas Bagworth – 
 Andrew Darcy – 

Among the most damming depositions are those given by John Turner:

Family and descendants

He was survived by his wife, Magdalene French, and five surviving children, Oliver Óge Martyn, Peter Martyn, John, Patrick and Magdalene, and his father Oliver Mór Martyn. He is an ancestor of both the first president of Sinn Féin, Edward Martyn (1859–1923), and the leader of the Irish Unionist Alliance and Ulster Unionist Party Edward Carson, Baron Carson (1854–1935).

A later descendant was the Hungarian artist, Ferenc Martyn (1899–1986).

He was a kinsman to Richard Martin (1754–1834), who was likewise an Irish nationalist.

See also

 The Tribes of Galway

External links
 http://1641.tcd.ie/about.php

References
 History of Galway, James Hardiman, Galway, 1820
 Old Galway, Maureen Donovan O'Sullivan, 1942
 Confederate Ireland 1642–49, Micheal O'Siochru, Four Courts Press, Dublin, 1999
 "Land ownership in the 17th Century", Adrian Martyn, in As The Centuries Passed: A History of Kiltullagh 1500–1900 pp. 93–96, 2000.
 Kingdoms in Crisis: Ireland in the 1640s, Micheál Ó Siochrú, ed., Dublin, 2000.
 Henry, William (2002). Role of Honour: The Mayors of Galway City 1485–2001. Galway: Galway City Council.  
 "A Galway Lawyer at the Confederation of Kilkenny: Richard Martin fitz Oliver of Dun Guaire, c.1602-1648", Adrian J. Martyn, Journal of the Genealogical Society of Ireland, Vol. 6, No. 3, Autumn 2005, pp. 4-10
 Martyn, Adrian, The Tribes of Galway:1124–1642, Galway, 2016. 

1600s births
1648 deaths
17th-century Irish people
Mayors of Galway
People from County Galway
Irish Roman Catholic Confederates
People of the Irish Confederate Wars
Alumni of King's Inns
Members of the Parliament of Ireland (pre-1801) for County Galway constituencies
Irish MPs 1634–1635